Wayne Joris Hood (July 23, 1913 – January 30, 1988) was born in Waupun, Wisconsin. He was a manufacturer in La Crosse, Wisconsin and was active in Republican politics for many years. He served as Wisconsin state chairman of the Republican Party from 1950 to 1953, and was executive director of the Republican National Committee during 1952 and 1953. He was active in Barry Goldwater's 1964 campaign and Richard Nixon’s 1968 campaign.

References

External links 

  Papers of Wayne J. Hood, Dwight D. Eisenhower Presidential Library
  Papers of Wayne J. Hood, Wisconsin Historical Society

1913 births
1988 deaths
People from Waupun, Wisconsin
Politicians from La Crosse, Wisconsin
Republican Party of Wisconsin chairs
Wisconsin Republicans